Alaranea is a genus of East African araneomorph spiders in the family Cyatholipidae, and was first described by C. E. Griswold in 1997.

Species
 it contains four species, all found in Madagascar:
Alaranea alba Griswold, 1997 – Madagascar
Alaranea ardua Griswold, 1997 – Madagascar
Alaranea betsileo Griswold, 1997 – Madagascar
Alaranea merina Griswold, 1997 (type) – Madagascar

References

Araneomorphae genera
Cyatholipidae
Spiders of Madagascar